Ocean Memories is an anthology album by Brazilian guitarist Bola Sete, released in 1999 through Samba Moon Records. It contains his 1972 album "Ocean" on the first disc and unreleased recordings on the second.

Track listing

Personnel 
John Fahey – production
Howard Johnston – remastering
Bola Sete – guitar
George Winston – production

References

External links 
 

1999 compilation albums
Albums produced by John Fahey (musician)
Bola Sete compilation albums